Rajjotok was a Bengali television Soap Opera that premiered on April 7, 2014, and aired on Zee Bangla. Produced by Surinder Films and it starred Mishmee Das as main female protagonist and Biswajit Ghosh as main male protagonist.

Plot summary 
'Rajjotok' (meaning perfect match) is a coming-of-age story of a cheerful filmy girl called 'Bonnie'. Bonnie, who is the protagonist of the show, is a unique character. She has always been so strongly influenced by films that she equates her real life situations with a film. In her search for her Hero, she ends up marrying poor and simpleton Shekhar who turns out to be completely contrary to any filmy Hero that she had ever dreamt of. Her life suddenly becomes unlike any movie she had ever seen or heard.

Cast
 Mishmee Das as Bornita / Bonnie
 Biswajit Ghosh as Shekhar
 Anamika Chakraborty as Bornita / Moumita / Mou 
 Bharat Kaul as Father of Bonnie & Mou
 Piyali Mitra as Mother of Bonnie & Mou
 Subhadra Mukherjee as Shekhar's Mother
 Kamalika Banerjee as Paternal aunt of Bonnie & Mou
 Kushal Chakraborty as Dr. Animesh
 Jayashree Mukherjee
 Anindita Saha Kapileshwari as Boni's aunt
 Somjita Bhattacharya
 Pushpita Mukherjee
 Prerona Bhattacharya
 Arpita Mukherjee
 Suvajit Kar
 Pradip Dhar
 Riju Biswas as Soham
 Tramila Bhattacharya as Soham's mother
 Suranjana Roy as Parul

References

External links
 Official Website on ZEE5

2014 Indian television series debuts
2016 Indian television series endings
Bengali-language television programming in India
Zee Bangla original programming